"Kid" is a song by British Australian singer and songwriter Peter Andre. The song was released in the United Kingdom on 9 February 2014 as the lead single from his tenth studio album Big Night (2014). The song peaked at number 144 on the UK Singles Chart. The song was chosen for the 2014 DreamWorks Animation movie Mr. Peabody & Sherman and was also used in the Autumn Iceland TV commercials.

Music video
A music video to accompany the release of "Kid" was first released onto YouTube on 31 January 2014 at a total length of three minutes and three seconds.

Track listing

Chart performance

Weekly charts

Release history

References

2014 singles
2014 songs
Peter Andre songs
Songs written by Peter Andre